The 1844 New York state elections was held on November 5, 1844, to elect the Governor, the Lieutenant Governor and four Canal Commissioners, as well as all members of the New York State Assembly and eight members of the New York State Senate.

History
The Act of May 6, 1844, which re-organized the Canal Department, required the Canal Commissioners to be elected by general ballot.

Results
The Democrats won all six state offices. 

67 Democrats, 45 Whigs and 16 American Republicans were elected to the Assembly session of 1845. 6 Democrats, 1 Whig and 1 American Republican were elected to the Senate. Thus the Senate of the 68th New York State Legislature consisted of 27 Democrats, 4 Whigs and 1 American Republican.

Sources
History of Political Parties in the State of New-York by John Stilwell Jenkins (Alden & Markham, Auburn NY, 1846; page 466)
Result in Manual of the Corporation of the City of New York (1852; page 367)

See also
New York gubernatorial elections
New York state elections

1844
1844 New York (state) elections
New York